Adriatico (Italian, Spanish, and Portuguese for the Adriatic Sea or the surrounding area) may refer to:

Adriatico (train), an express train linking Milan and Bari, Italy, 1973–2005
Adriatico Street, in Manila, Philippines
MS SNAV Adriatico, a ferry serving the Naples-Palermo route for GNV
Stadio Adriatico – Giovanni Cornacchia, a stadium in Pescara, Abruzzo, Italy

See also

Adriatic (disambiguation)